Erotic furniture, also known as sex furniture, is any form of furniture that is designed to act as an aid to sexual activity. Some examples function as a positioning tool, assisting with comfort, penetration level and stimulation. Others are constructed to be an aid to erotic bondage. The functionality may be obvious or the erotic furniture may be designed to appear as conventional furniture. While almost any furniture can be used to aid sexual activity, conventional furniture is not considered to be erotic furniture as its primary use is not erotic. Erotic furniture can also  be furniture decorated with erotic art.

History
In ancient Assyria there are examples of furniture decorated with erotic reliefs dating to the 13th century BC.

In the 18th century, the Russian Empress Catherine the Great collected erotic furniture, including tables with penises for legs and other items carved in relief with penises and vulvas.

The 1791 French novel Les Délices de Coblentz describes beds that are designed to increase sexual pleasure by virtue of the elasticity of their springs.

The British King Edward VII, who was heavily overweight, used a specially constructed "love seat" when he visited the famous brothel, Le Chabanais in Paris. The piece still exists and a replica is exhibited at the Musée de l'Erotisme in Pigalle.

Edward Gorey's The Curious Sofa, (1961) is a neo-Victorian pseudo-porno satire described as a "pornographic illustrated story about furniture". The book consists of euphemistic illustrations with strategically deployed objects, such as potted plants and tree branches, that block the reader's view of sexual activities taking place on furniture.

The British pop artist Allen Jones has designed erotic furniture. His piece Hatstand, Table and Chair, consisting of scantily clad female mannequins converted to items of furniture, was first exhibited in 1970.

In modern times erotic furniture continues to be produced mainly by small businesses rather than large scale manufacturers.

Types

Specifically designed furniture for erotic purposes can include:
 Devices to aid impact play activities such as erotic spanking and flagellation. Examples of this type of furniture include the Berkley Horse and the X-cross.
 Sex swings, either freestanding or temporarily installable in places such as doorways.
 Fisting slings
 Sex gliders (also known as monkey rockers) – rocking stools with built-in dildos
 Devices for using gravity to aid in lovemaking without the use of complicated slings.
 Various types of angled foam wedges or specially designed sex pillows that support various sex positions. Liberator Shapes are an example which can be used to improve g-spot and cervical stimulation. Another example are the ergonomically based Lovebumpers.
 Bondage equipment such as stocks, pillories and cages.
 Smotherboxes and other queening stools used for facesitting.
 Sex chairs and sex sofas, positioning furniture which in some cases have openings to allow for genital or anal access.
 The Love Chair, a chair made of curved tubular steel, articulated in several ways and designed to facilitate otherwise impossible sexual acts. This device was advertised in men's magazines in the mid-1970s, and is seen in at least one of Nina Hartley's Guide to videos, but it is no longer commercially available.
 Wooden horses, which are shaped much like the sawhorses used for carpentry, but have a sharpened edge and are primarily sat on to achieve a feeling similar to a crotch rope in bondage.
 Sybians, a type of sex machine consisting of a vibrating saddle-like seat with an upward-pointing shaft for internal stimulation.

See also
 Human furniture
 List of BDSM equipment
 Sex machine
 Sex toy

References

Bibliography

  (101 pages. Design criteria for assistive furniture, with sections on accommodation of disabled persons.)

Sex toys
Furniture